Deep Six is a 1986 compilation album featuring six Seattle-based rock bands. It was the first release by C/Z Records, with a catalogue number of CZ01 for 2,000 copies. The album was reissued as a joint C/Z Records/A&M Records release on April 5, 1994.

Development
The album was compiled by Seattle locals Chris Hanzsek and Tina Casale of CZ Records to showcase what was going on in the Seattle rock community at this time by drawing on the talents of six like-minded bands. The album was not a commercial success; however, it is vital to the history of grunge. It represents the early recordings of a handful of bands that would later become key figures in grunge, and helped establish its concepts and sound.

In the early 1980s, the Seattle branch of the indie movement was influenced by punk rock; however, it removed its speed and its structure and added elements of metal. The Melvins slowed down punk rock to develop their own slow, heavy, sludgy sound. When they contributed four tracks to Deep Six they were regarded as one of Seattle's top bands. Soundgarden provided the most abrasive sound on the album after having formed only a year before. The U-Men contributed minimalist punk with "Sabbath" style metal. Skin Yard's guitarist, Jack Endino, would go on to record and produce many of the grunge bands, and helped to establish Soundgarden, Mudhoney, and Nirvana. He was able to bring a similar sonic quality to some of the tracks recorded by bands who had diverse sounds.

Green River had released its debut EP Come On Down several months before Deep Six; therefore, Come On Down is considered the first grunge record. Members from this band would later form Pearl Jam and Mudhoney, two bands that would become internationally famous. However, Deep Six featured several other bands' first appearance on record and is regarded as the first grunge compilation.

Track listing
Green River – "10,000 Things" – 3:37
Melvins – "Scared" – 2:19
Melvins – "Blessing the Operation" – 0:44
Malfunkshun – "With Yo' Heart (Not Yo' Hands)" – 3:54
Skin Yard – "Throb" – 5:29
Soundgarden – "Heretic" – 3:22
Soundgarden – "Tears to Forget" – 2:06
Malfunkshun – "Stars-N-You" – 1:46
Melvins – "Grinding Process" – 2:09
Melvins – "She Waits" – 0:40
Skin Yard – "The Birds" - 3:56
Soundgarden – "All Your Lies" – 3:53
Green River – "Your Own Best Friend" – 6:21
The U-Men – "They" – 3:32

An alternative version of Soundgarden's "Heretic" appears on the soundtrack for the 1990 film Pump Up the Volume, as well as on the Soundgarden EP Loudest Love. A re-recorded version of Soundgarden's "All Your Lies" (with new drummer Matt Cameron) appears on their 1988 album Ultramega OK; the original also appears only on the double-disc version of band's 2010 compilation album Telephantasm, while a re-recorded version of "Tears to Forget" (with Cameron) appears on their 1987 EP Screaming Life. Alternative versions of the Melvins' "Blessing the Operation" and "Grinding Process" appear on 26 Songs.

Personnel
Chris Hanzsek – producer
Tina Casale – producer
Reyza Sageb – original blue album artwork
Charles Peterson – photography
Jane Duke – photography
Green River
Mark Arm – vocals
Jeff Ament – bass
Stone Gossard – guitar
Bruce Fairweather – guitar
Alex Vincent – drums
Melvins
King Buzzo – vocals, guitar
Matt Lukin – bass
Dale Crover – drums
Malfunkshun
Andrew Wood – vocals, bass
Regan Hagar – drums
Kevin Wood – guitar
Skin Yard
Ben McMillan – vocals, saxophone on "The Birds"
Jack Endino – guitar
Daniel House – bass
Matt Cameron – drums
Soundgarden
Chris Cornell – vocals
Hiro Yamamoto – bass
Kim Thayil – guitar
Scott Sundquist – drums
The U-Men
John Bigley – vocals
Tom Price – guitar
Jim Tillman – bass
Charlie Ryan – drums

References

Bibliography

External links
CZRecords.com
Deep Six on Jack Endino's homepage
Deep Six at the Unofficial Soundgarden Homepage

Grunge compilation albums
1986 compilation albums
A&M Records compilation albums
C/Z Records compilation albums